Evan is both an English and Welsh given name derived from "Iefan", a Welsh form for the name John. In other languages it bears similarities to "Ivan", "Ian", and "Juan"; the name John itself is derived from the ancient Hebrew name  Yəhôḥānān, which means "Yahweh is gracious". Evan can also be the shortened version of the Greek names "Evangelos" (meaning "good messenger") and "Evander" (meaning "good man"). While mostly male, the name is also given to women, as with actress Evan Rachel Wood, leading some to characterise it as unisex. It may also be encountered as a surname, of which Evans is the most common version.

Other languages also assign meaning to Evan as a word or name. It is related to the Gaelic word "Eóghan" meaning "youth" or "young warrior", and means "right-handed" in Scots.  literally means "rock".

Popularity
The popularity of the name Evan in the United States had risen steadily in recent decades, going from the 440th-ranked male name in 1957 to peaking at the 35th-ranked male name in 2009. Immediately afterward, however, it began to decline precipitously, dropping out of the top 50 male names in the US by 2013 and out of the top 100 by 2020. Among American males in 2021, the name had less than a third of the popularity it had had in 2010.

Female popularity 
While Evan is still predominantly a male name, its use among girls has become increasingly common. Its use in both contexts started to rise in the late 1970s, but in contrast to the steep decline that Evan as a male name saw after 2009, the frequency of Evan as a female name more than tripled as a share of overall use in the same period. By 2021, the name had modestly increased in popularity above its usage in 2010 among American girls.

People

Given name
Evan A. Baker (born 1952), American opera historian
Evan A. Lottman (1931-2001), American film editor
Evan Abraham (1901-1990), Welsh footballer
Evan Adams (born 1966), Indigenous Canadian actor, playwright, and physician
Evan Adermann (1927-2001), Australian politician
Evan Alex Cole (born 1985), American actor
Evan Amos (born 1983), American video game photographer
Evan Arapostathis (born 1963), American former NFL player
Evan Armstrong (1943-2017), Scottish professional boxer
Evan Arnold, American actor
Evan Arnold (cricketer) (born 1974), Australian former cricketer and amateur footballer
Evan Atar Adaha (born 1966/1967), South Sudanese surgeon
Evan Austin (born 1992), American Paralympic swimmer
Evan B. Goss (1872-1930), American judge
Evan B. Stotsenburg (1865-1937), American politician and lawyer
Evan Bacon (born 1997/1998), American LEGO-artist and software developer
Evan Baillie (1741-1835), Scottish slave-trader, merchant, and landowner
Evan Balfour (born 1965), Scottish footballer
Evan Bartels, American singer-songwriter, musician, and writer
Evan Bass (born 1982), American businessperson, erectile dysfunction specialist, and television personality
Evan Bates (born 1989), American ice dancer
Evan Battey (born 1998), American NBL player
Evan Baxter, several people
Evan Bayh (born 1955), American lawyer, lobbyist, and politician
Evan Baylis (born 1993), American NFL player
Evan Beard (born 1986), American entrepreneur and engineer
Evan Beloff, Canadian film writer, producer, director, and production company executive
Evan Berger (born 1987), Australian former footballer
Evan Berger (politician) (born 1960), Canadian politician
Evan Bernard, American commercial- and music video director
Evan Bernstein (athlete) (born 1960), Israeli former Olympic wrestler
Evan Berry (born 1995), American NFL player
Evan Bevan (1803-1866), Welsh writer
Evan Bird (born 2000), Canadian actor
Evan Blass (born 1978), American blogger, editor, and phone leaker
Evan Boehm (born 1993), American NFL player
Evan Bouchard (born 1999), Canadian NHL player
Evan Bradds (born 1994), American NBA coach and former college player
Evan Brandt, American reporter
Evan Breeze (1798-1855), Welsh poet and schoolmaster
Evan Brewer (born 1981), American musician
Evan Brophey (born 1986), Canadian former NHL player
Evan Brown, several people
Evan Bruinsma (born 1992), American DBL player
Evan Bryant (1839-1918), English Presbyterian missionary
Evan Buliung, Canadian actor
Evan-Burrows Fontaine (1898-1984), American interpretive dancer and actress
Evan Bush (born 1986), American MLS player
Evan C. Kim (born 1953), American actor
Evan Call (born 1988), American composer and arranger
Evan Carawan, American hammered dulcimer and mandolin player
Evan Carey (born 1994), Canadian track cyclist
Evan Carlson (born 1953), Canadian politician
Evan Centopani (born 1981), American personal trainer, nutritionist, and retired professional bodybuilder
Evan Chambers (born 1963), American composer and musician
Evan Chandler, American screenwriter and dentist, known for accusing Michael Jackson of molesting his son
Evan Charlton (1904-1984), British artist
Evan Charney, American political scientist and associate professor
Evan Charteris (1864-1940), English biographer, barrister, and arts administrator
Evan Chen (born 1996), Taiwanese-American mathematician
Evan Chesler (born 1949), American lawyer
Evan Chevalier (born 1992), French footballer
Evan Cheverie (born 1980), Canadian retired professional ice hockey forward
Evan Christopher (born 1969), American jazz clarinetist and composer
Evan Cody (born 1995), Irish hurler
Evan Cohen, South African-born Israeli linguist and tenured professor
Evan Cole (born 1961), American retail chief executive
Evan Comerford, several people
Evan Conti (born 1993), American-Israeli basketball player and coach
Evan Conway (born 1997), American USL player
Evan Cooper (disambiguation), several people
Evan Copley (1930-2018), American academic and musician
Evan Corcoran (born 1964), American former federal prosecutor
Evan Cotton (1868-1939), British politician, barrister, administrator, journalist, historian, and writer
Evan Coyne Maloney (born 1972), American inactive documentary filmmaker
Evan Craft (born 1991), American Contemporary worship music singer
Evan Cranley, Canadian musician
Evan Crawford, several people
Evan Crooks, American actor
Evan Currie (born 1976), Canadian fiction writer
Evan D. Skillman (born 1955), American astronomer and astrophysicist
Evan Dahm (born 1987), American webcartoonist
Evan Dando (born 1967), American musician
Evan Dara, American novelist
Evan Daugherty (born 1981), American screenwriter, director, and editor
Evan Davies, several people
Evan DePaul (born 1996), Canadian retired sailor
Evan Dimas (born 1995), Indonesian professional footballer
Evan Dobelle (born 1945), American educator
Evan Dollard (born 1982), American athlete and rock climber
Evan Dorkin (born 1965), American comics artist and cartoonist
Evan Douglis, American architect, scholar, and dean
Evan Dunfee (born 1990), Canadian race walker and Olympian
Evan Dunham (born 1981), American mixed martial artist
Evan Dunsky, American television writer, producer, and director
Evan Durbin (1906-1948), British economist and politician
Evan Duthie (born 2000), Scottish DJ and music producer
Evan Dybvig (born 1975), American Olympic freeskier
Evan E. Eichler, American geneticist
Evan E. Settle (1848-1899), American lawyer and politician
Evan Eckenrode, American YouTuber, video blogger, and entertainer
Evan Edinger (born 1990), American YouTuber
Evan Edwards (1898-1958), Welsh footballer
Evan Elken (born 1977), American former cyclist
Evan Engram (born 1994), American NFL player
Evan Enwerem (1935-2007), Nigerian politician
Evan Esar (1899-1995), American humorist
Evan Eschmeyer (born 1975), American retired NBA player
Evan Esselink (born 1992), Canadian long-distance runner
Evan Eugene Fraser (1865-1949), Ontario contractor and political figure
Evan Evagora, Australian actor
Evan Evans, several people
Evan Fallenberg (born 1961), American-born Israeli writer and translator
Evan Farmer (born 1972), American business owner, television host, radio host, actor, musician, designer/customizer, and author
Evan Felker (born 1984), American singer, songwriter, and guitarist
Evan Ferguson (born 2004), Irish professional footballer
Evan Finnegan (born 1995), Irish footballer
Evan Finney (born 1994), American soccer player
Evan Flatow (born 1956), American orthopaedic surgeon-scientist and researcher
Evan Forde (born 1952), American oceanographer
Evan Fong (born 1992), Canadian internet personality, video game commentator, music producer, DJ, and YouTuber
Evan Foulkes (c. 1751-1825), British politician
Evan Fournier (born 1992), French NBA player
Evan Fowler (born 1995), American USL player
Evan Frankfort (born 1970), American television music producer
Evan Fraser, several people
Evan Frasure (born 1951), American politician
Evan Freed (born 1946), American attorney and photographer
Evan Furness (born 1998), French professional tennis player
Evan G. Galbraith (1928-2008), American Ambassador to France under President Ronald Reagan
Evan G. Greenberg (born 1955), American business executive
Evan Gattis (born 1986), American former MLB player
Evan Geiselman (born 1993), American surfer
Evan Giia, American soprano and pop singer
Evan Gill (born 1992), Canadian CFL player
Evan Glodell, American feature film director, producer, writer, and actor
Evan Goldberg (born 1982), Canadian-American screenwriter, film producer, director, and comedian
Evan Golden, several people
Evan Gordon (cricketer) (born 1960), South African cricketer
Evan Gorga (1865-1957), Italian lyric tenor
Evan Goyke (born 1982), American attorney, politician, and academic
Evan Gray (born 1954), New Zealand former cricketer
Evan Greebel, American convicted felon and former attorney
Evan Green, several people
Evan Greer, American activist, writer, and musician
Evan Griffiths (1795-1873), Welsh clergyman
Evan Gruzis (born 1979), American contemporary artist
Evan Gulbis (born 1986), Australian cricketer
Evan Gumbs (born 1997), English professional footballer
Evan H. Caminker (born 1961), American lawyer and dean
Evan Hammond (born 1980), Canadian radio show host, hockey broadcaster, and blogger
Evan Handler (born 1961), American novelist and actor
Evan Hansen (politician) (born 1966), American politician
Evan Harding (born 1984), American USL player
Evan Hardy (1927-1994), English rugby union cricketer
Evan Harris (born 1965), British politician
Evan Harris Humphrey (1875-1963), American army brigadier general
Evan Harrison (born 1970), American marketing person and radio executive
Evan Hause (born 1967), American composer, percussionist, and conductor
Evan Hayward (1876-1958), English politician
Evan Helmuth (1977-2017), American film and television actor
Evan Hewitt (born 1978), Australian former AFL player
Evan Hill (1919-2010), American journalist and professor
Evan Hirschelman, American classical guitarist and composer
Evan Hlavacek (born 1974), American former football player
Evan Hodgson (born 1998), English rugby league footballer
Evan Holloway (born 1967), American artist
Evan Holyfield (born 1997), American professional boxer
Evan Hooker (1901-1962), English footballer
Evan Horwood (born 1986), English former professional footballer
Evan Howell (1839-1905), American politician, early telegraph operator, and soldier
Evan Hoyt (born 1995), Mexican-born British tennis player
Evan Huffman (born 1990), American former professional cyclist
Evan Hughes, American operatic bass-baritone
Evan Hultman (born 1925), American politician and attorney
Evan Hunter (1926-2005), American author and screenwriter
Evan Hunziker (1970-1996), American civilian whom North Korea imprisoned
Evan Ira Farber (1922-2009), American librarian and college faculty
Evan J. Crane (1889-1966), American chemist
Evan J. Peterson, American author, poet, and educator
Evan Jackson Leong, Chinese-American film director and documentary filmmaker
Evan Jacobs (born 1968), American visual effects and 3D stereoscopic supervisor
Evan Jacobs (musician), American past member of folk rock band Midlake
Evan Jager (born 1989), American distance runner
Evan James, several people
Evan Jenkins, several people
Evan Jenne (born 1977), American politician
Evan John Price (1840-1899), Canadian lumber merchant and politician
Evan Johns (1956-2017), American guitarist
Evan Johnson (born 1994), Canadian CFL player
Evan Johnson (filmmaker), Canadian filmmaker
Evan Jolitz (born 1951), American former NFL player
Evan Jones, several people
Evan Jonigkeit (born 1983), American actor
Evan K (born 1994), Greek/German composer and guitarist
Evan Karagias (born 1973), American professional wrestler and actor
Evan Karakolis (born 1994), Canadian javelin thrower
Evan Katz, American television writer- and producer
Evan Kaufmann (born 1984), German-American former NHL player
Evan Kemp (1937-1997), American disability rights activist
Evan Khouri (born 2003), English footballer
Evan King (born 1992), American professional tennis player
Evan Kirk (born 1987), Canadian NLL player
Evan Klamer (1923-1978), Danish cyclist
Evan Kleiman, American chef, radio personality, food writer, and restaurateur
Evan Kohlmann (born 1979), American terrorism consultant- and analyst, senior investigator, and expert witness
Evan Kostopoulos (born 1990), Australian footballer of Greek descent
Evan Kruczynski (born 1995), American professional baseball pitcher
Evan Kuhlman, American writer of children’s fiction novels
Evan L. Schwab (born 1938), American attorney
Evan Landi (born 1990), American NFL player
Evan Lavender-Smith (born 1977), American writer, editor, and professor
Evan Lee, several people
Evan Leigh (1810-1876), English author, inventor, engineer, and manufacturer
Evan Lewis, several people
Evan Lilly (born 1989), Canadian curler
Evan Lindquist (born 1936), American artist and printmaker
Evan Llewellyn, several people
Evan Lloyd, several people
Evan Longoria (born 1985), American MLB player
Evan Louro (born 1996), American MLS player
Evan Low (born 1983), American politician
Evan Lowenstein (born 1974), American member of musical duo Evan and Jaron
Evan Luard (1926-1991), English politician
Evan Lurie (born 1954), American composer and musician
Evan Lyon (born 1971), American medical professor
Evan Lyons, Irish Gaelic footballer
Evan Lysacek (born 1985), American retired figure skater
Evan M. Johnson (1861-1923), American army officer
Evan M. Whidden (1898-1980), Canadian Christian minister and academic
Evan M. Woodward (1838-1904), American Civil War Union Army officer
Evan Ma (born 1992), Canadian actor, singer, and rapper
Evan MacColl (1808-1898), Scottish-born Canadian poet, writer, and songwriter
Evan MacCormick (1882-1918), New Zealand cricketer
Evan MacDonald (born 1981), German-born Canadian wrestler
Evan MacGregor (1842-1926), British civil servant
Evan Mack (born 1981), American composer, librettist, and pianist
Evan Mackie (1917-1986), New Zealand fighter pilot and flying ace
Evan MacLane (born 1982), American MLB pitcher
Evan Maguire (born 1942), New Zealand long-distance runner
Evan Malbone Johnson (1791-1865), American Episcopal priest and clergy
Evan Mandery (born 1967), American author and criminal justice academic
Evan Marginson (1909-1977), Australian politician
Evan Mariano (born 1988), Belizean professional footballer
Evan Marshall, several people
Evan Marzilli (born 1991), American former MLB player
Evan Mather (born 1970), American landscape architect, urban designer, and filmmaker
Evan Mathis (born 1981), American former NFL player
Evan Mawarire (born 1977), Zimbabwean pastor and activist
Evan Mawdsley (born 1945), British historian and former history professor
Evan Maxwell, American journalist, novelist, and non-fiction writer
Evan McCollough (born 1987), Canadian former CFL player
Evan McEachran (born 1997), Canadian freeskier
Evan McEneny (born 1994), Canadian AHL player
Evan McGrath (born 1986), Canadian former AHL player
Evan McKie (born 1983), Canadian ballet dancer, choreographer, and writer
Evan McMillan (born 1986), Irish football coach and former player
Evan McMullin (born 1976), American politician and former CIA officer
Evan McPherson (born 1999), American NFL player
Evan Mecham (1924-2008), American businessman and politician
Evan Medell (born 1997), American Para Taekwondo practitioner
Evan Meek (born 1983), American MLB player
Evan Mercer, Canadian actor
Evan Milward (born 1984), Canadian former CSL player
Evan Mobley (born 2001), American NBA player
Evan Mock (born 1997), American model, actor, and skateboarder
Evan Montvel Cohen (born 1966), American businessman
Evan Moore (born 1985), American former NFL player and current TV football analyst
Evan Moorhead (born 1978), Australian political strategist and former politician
Evan Morgan, several people
Evan Morris (1977-2015), American lobbyist
Evan "Mose" Hyde, Belizean television executive and talk show host
Evan Mosey (born 1989), British-American EIHL player
Evan Mulholland, Australian politician
Evan Murphy (born 1988), American professional racing cyclist
Evan Murray-Macgregor (1785-1841), Scottish colonial administrator and senior British army officer
Evan Nagao (born 1996), American musician and competitive yo-yo player
Evan Naji (born 1988), Iraqi singer, composer, and songwriter
Evan Narcisse, American comic book writer, journalist, and video game narrative designer
Evan Ndicka (born 1999), French professional footballer
Evan Neal (born 2000), American NFL player
Evan Nepean (1752-1822), British politician and colonial administrator
Evan Nepean (cricketer) (1865-1906), English barrister and cricketer
Evan Neufeldt (born 1987), Canadian skeleton racer
Evan Neumann (born 1972), American software developer and US fugitive
Evan Newton (born 1988), American USL player
Evan Nichols (born 2004), American Paralympic ice sled hockey player
Evan Niland (born 1998), Irish hurler
Evan Noel (1879-1928), English rackets player
Evan Oakley, American poet
Evan Oberg (born 1988), Canadian retired NHL player
Evan O'Dorney (born 1993), American mathematician
Evan Oglesby (born 1981), American former NFL player
Evan Oliphant (born 1982), Scottish bicycle racer
Evan Olmstead (born 1991), Canadian rugby union player
Evan Olson (born 1967), American rock singer and songwriter
Evan O’Hanlon (born 1988), Australian Paralympic athlete
Evan O'Neill Kane (1861-1932), American physician and surgeon
Evan O'Neill Kane (physicist) (1924-2006), American physicist
Evan Osnos (born 1976), American journalist and author
Evan Owen Allen (1805-1852), Welsh writer and poet
Evan Parke (born 1968), Jamaican-born American actor
Evan Parker (born 1944), British tenor and soprano saxophone player
Evan Parry (1865-1938), Welsh-born New Zealand electrical engineer
Evan Patak (born 1984), American volleyball player
Evan Pateshall (1817-1885), British politician
Evan Penny (born 1953), South African-born Canadian sculptor
Evan Peter Aurand (1917-1989), American naval officer
Evan Peters (born 1987), American actor
Evan Pettersson, Swedish retired footballer
Evan Phillips (born 1994), American MLB pitcher
Evan Pilgrim (born 1972), American former NFL player
Evan Porter (born 1987), American baseball coach and former player
Evan Press (born 2000), Welsh footballer
Evan Price, Welsh politician and barrister
Evan Prodromou (born 1968), American software developer and open source advocate
Evan Pugh (1828-1864), American academic administrator and agricultural chemist
Evan Puschak (born 1988), American video essayist, journalist, and YouTuber
Evan R. Bernstein (born 1974), American nonprofit executive
Evan Rachel Wood (born 1987), American actress, singer, and activist
Evan Rankin (born 1986), American former ECHL player
Evan Ratliff (born c. 1975), American journalist and author
Evan Ravenel (born 1989), American professional basketball player
Evan Reed (born 1985), American former MLB pitcher
Evan Rees, several people
Evan Reilly, American television writer, producer, and director
Evan Richards (1862-1931), Welsh international rugby union player
Evan Roberts, several people
Evan Roderick (born 1995), Canadian actor
Evan Rodrigues (born 1993), Canadian NHL player
Evan Rodriguez (born 1988), American former NFL player
Evan Roe (born 2000), American actor
Evan Rogers, American songwriter and record producer
Evan Rogers (priest) (1914-1982), British archdeacon
Evan Roos (born 2000), South African rugby union player
Evan Rosen, American author, speaker, business strategist, blogger, and journalist
Evan Rosenfeld (born 1981), American film and television producer
Evan Ross (born 1988), American actor and musician
Evan Roth (born 1978), American artist
Evan Rotundo (born 2004), American soccer player
Evan Royster (born 1987), American former NFL player
Evan Rutckyj (born 1992), Canadian MLB pitcher
Evan Ryan (born 1971), American public servant and White House Cabinet Secretary
Evan S. Connell (1924-2013), American writer
Evan S. Tyler (1843-1923), American politician and American Civil War Union Army soldier
Evan Sanders (born 1981), Indonesian actor and pop singer
Evan Sayet (born 1960), American Jewish comedian, speaker, and conservative humorist
Evan Schwartz, several people
Evan Scribner (born 1985), American former MLB pitcher
Evan Seinfeld, American musician, actor, director, photographer, writer, and former pornographic actor
Evan Seys (1604-1685), Welsh politician
Evan Shanks (born 1964), American rock bassist
Evan Shanley (born 1986), American attorney and politician
Evan Sharp (born 1982), American billionaire Internet entrepreneur
Evan Shefflin (born 1999), Irish hurler
Evan Shelby (1720-1794), Welsh-American trapper and militia officer
Evan Shelby Alexander (c. 1767-1809), American politician
Evan Shinners (born 1986), American pianist, clavichordist, and electronic music composer
Evan Shute (1905-1978), Canadian obstetrician, poet, and writer
Evan Siddall (born 1965), Canadian chief executive
Evan Siegel (born 1954), American mathematics and computer science professor
Evan Siemann, American bioscience professor
Evan Simpson (born 1957), American politician
Evan Singleton (born 1992), American strongman competitor and former profession wrestler
Evan Skolnick (born 1966), American writer, editor, and producer
Evan Skoug (born 1995), American MLB catcher
Evan Smith, several people
Evan Smotrycz (born 1991), American basketball player
Evan Solomon (born 1968), Canadian columnist, political journalist, radio host, and publisher
Evan Soumilena (born 1996), Indonesian professional futsal player
Evan Spencer (born 1993), American former NFL player
Evan Spicer (1849-1937), British politician
Evan Spiegel (born 1990), American founder of Snapchat
Evan Spiliotopoulos (born c. 1973), Greek-American screenwriter, film producer, and film director
Evan Stamer (born 2001), American racing driver
Evan Stephens (1854-1930), Welsh-born American Mormon composer and hymn writer
Evan Stewart, several people
Evan Stoflet (born 1984), American ECHL player
Evan Stone (born 1964), American pornographic film actor and director
Evan Strong (born 1986), American Para-snowboard cross racer
Evan Susser (born 1985), American comedy writer and television producer
Evan Tanner (1971-2008), American mixed martial artist
Evan Taubenfeld (born 1983), American singer and musician
Evan Taylor (born 1989), Jamaican footballer
Evan Thapa (born 2003), Indian professional footballer
Evan Thomas (disambiguation), several people
Evan Thompson (born 1962), Canadian writer and philosophy professor
Evan Thornley (born 1964), Australian entrepreneur
Evan Todd (born 1989), American actor and producer
Evan Tracey, American communications executive, media analyst, and chief operating officer
Evan Trupp (born 1987), American ECHL player
Evan Turner (born 1988), American NBA coach and former player
Evan van Moerkerke (born 1993), Canadian competitive swimmer
Evan Vickers (born 1954), American politician
Evan Vogds (1923-1994), American NFL player
Evan Vucci (born 1977), American photographer
Evan W. Scott (1876-1955), American naval officer
Evan Waldrep (born 1997), American professional soccer player
Evan Walker, several people
Evan Wallace (1982-2017), American rapper
Evan Wallach (born 1949), American lawyer and judge
Evan Walters (1892-1951), Welsh artist
Evan Washburn (born 1984), American sports reporter
Evan Watkin (born 1951), New Zealand cricket umpire
Evan Watkins (1882-1956), Welsh rugby footballer
Evan Weaver (born 1998), American NFL player
Evan Weinger (born 1997), American AHL player
Evan Weinstock (born 1991), American Olympic bobsledder
Evan Wells, American video game designer and programmer
Evan Wensley (born 1998), Malaysian professional footballer
Evan Whildin, American firearm designer
Evan White, several people
Evan Whitfield (born 1977), American retired MLS player
Evan Whitton (1928-2018), Australian journalist
Evan Wickham (born 1981), American Christian musician and pastor
Evan Williams, several people
Evan Winter, Canadian fantasy writer
Evan Wisdom (1869-1945), Australian politician, businessman, and army officer
Evan Wolfson (born 1957), American attorney and gay rights advocate
Evan Woolley, Alberta politician
Evan Worrell (born 1979), American politician
Evan Worthington (born 1995), American football player
Evan Wright (born 1965/1966), American writer
Evan Wynn (born 1962), American former legislator
Evan X Hyde (born 1947), Belizean writer, journalist, media executive, and former politician
Evan Yang (1920-1978), Chinese film director, screenwriter, actor, and songwriter
Evan Yardley (born 1993), Welsh rugby union player
Evan Yo (born 1986), Taiwanese pop singer-songwriter
Evan Young (born 1976), American attorney and judge
Evan Zhu (born 1998), American tennis player
Evan Zimmermann, American businessman, investor, and philanthropist
Evan Ziporyn (born 1959), American composer and musician

Fictional characters
Evan Barnett, businessman in the film Little Rascals
Evan Baxter, in the 2007 film Evan Almighty
Evan "Buck" Buckley, a character in the TV series 9-1-1
Evan Chambers, in the 2007 TV series Greek
Evan Delaney, female writer and legal assistant in five novels by Meg Gardiner
Evan Drake, a character in the TV sitcom Cheers
Evan Hansen, the title character in the Broadway musical Dear Evan Hansen and its 2021 film adaptation.
Evan Hawkins, Paramedic Field Chief on Chicago Fire
Evan Lewis, a character from Final Destination 2
Evan Lorne, a character in the 2004 Canadian–American Sci-Fi Channel television series Stargate SG-1 and Stargate Atlantis, played by Kavan Smith
Evan Michael Tanner, government agent with permanent insomnia in eight novels by Lawrence Block
Evan Treborn, in the 2004 film The Butterfly Effect
Evan Rosier, deceased Death Eater in the Harry Potter series
Evan Webber, main character in the 2005 film Knock Knock

Surname
Rev. Cadwallader William Evan (?–1876), first minister of Stow Church, Adelaide, South Australia
Mostyn Evan (1861–1924), Cadwallader William Evan's son. A South Australian lawyer and sports administrator

Popular culture references to the name Evan
Evan Almighty, a 2007 film and standalone sequel to the 2003 film Bruce Almighty.
Dear Evan Hansen, an award-winning 2016 Broadway musical and its film adaptation.

See also

Euan
Inan

References

English given names
Welsh masculine given names
English-language unisex given names
English masculine given names
English feminine given names
Welsh feminine given names